The Martin P6M SeaMaster, built by the Glenn L. Martin Company, was a 1950s strategic bomber flying boat for the United States Navy that almost entered service; production aircraft were built and Navy crews were undergoing operational training, with service entry expected in about six months, when the program was cancelled on 21 August 1959. Envisioned as a strategic nuclear weapon delivery system for the Navy, the SeaMaster was eclipsed by the Polaris submarine-launched ballistic missile (SLBM). Due to the political situation at the Pentagon, the Navy promoted the P6M primarily as a high speed minelayer.

Design and development
In the immediate postwar defense climate, the United States Air Force's Strategic Air Command was the linchpin of the United States' security as the sole means of delivery of the nation's nuclear arsenal. The Navy saw its strategic role being eclipsed by the Air Force and knew both its prestige and budgets were at stake.

This was cancelled in 1950 shortly after her keel was laid down, a victim of budget cuts and US Air Force interference. In response, the Navy chose to create a "Seaplane Striking Force", useful for both nuclear and conventional warfare, including reconnaissance and minelaying. Groups of these planes supported by seaplane tenders or special submarines could be located close to the enemy, and being mobile, they would be hard to neutralize.

The aircraft was to be capable of a low altitude dash at Mach 0.9 (1,100 km/h). Both Convair and Martin submitted proposals, and the Martin proposal was chosen as more promising. An order for two prototypes was issued which was projected to lead to six pre-production aircraft and a projected twenty-four production aircraft.

Originally the plane was to have a Curtiss-Wright turbo-ramjet engine, but this ran into problems and a more conventional Allison J71-A-4 turbojet was employed, fitted in pairs in overwing pods to keep the spray out of the intakes. Wings swept at 40° were used; they displayed a notable anhedral and were designed with tip tanks that doubled as floats on the water. Many features of Martin's XB-51 bomber prototype were used, including an all-flying "T" tail and a rotating bomb bay—pneumatically sealed against seawater in the P6M.

Operational history

The first flight of the XP6M-1 came on 14 July 1955, but early tests showed that the engines were mounted too close to the fuselage and scorched it when afterburners were used, leading to angling the engines slightly outward in subsequent aircraft. Flight testing was initially successful, but, on 7 December 1955, a control system fault destroyed the first prototype with the loss of all aboard. The first prototype, BuNo 138821, c/n XP-1, disintegrated in flight at  due to the horizontal tail going to full up due to a control malfunction, subjecting the airframe to 9 g stress as it began an outside loop, crashing into the Potomac River near the junction of St. Mary's River, killing four crew members.

Eleven months later, on 9 November 1956, the second prototype, BuNo 138822, c/n XP-2, first flown on 18 May 1956, was also destroyed, due to a change made in the horizontal stabilizer control system without adequate evaluation before test flying the design. The crash occurred at 15:36 near Odessa, Delaware due to a faulty elevator jack. As the seaplane nosed up at ~ and failed to respond to control inputs, the crew of four ejected. The airframe broke up after falling to  before impact.

The first pre-production YP6M-1 was completed about a year later, with testing resuming in January 1958.

Five more were built in 1958 when the Navy announced that Harvey Point Defense Testing Activity in Hertford, North Carolina, would serve as the testing grounds for the fleet of Martin P6M SeaMasters. These aircraft were fitted with test versions of the full combat equipment suite and were used for bombing, mine laying and reconnaissance evaluations. The J71 engines were unreliable and the aircraft had spray ingestion problems at higher gross weights, which limited takeoffs to ideal conditions. The P6M-1 also had a serious control deficiency due to porpoising under some trim settings. These deficiencies resulted in the P6M-1 program being cut as it was no longer considered possible for it to be successfully developed.

The Navy and Martin felt that a new version, the P6M-2, would provide a useful aircraft. The first was rolled out in early 1959. Changes included new, more powerful Pratt & Whitney J75 engines, an aerial refueling probe, improved avionics, and a canopy with better visibility. A buddy refueling drogue kit had also been developed to fit in the bomb bay. Three had been built by summer 1959 and Navy crews were moving them through operational conversion when the program was abruptly canceled in August of that year.

The P6M-2 was an impressive aircraft; its Mach 0.9 (1,100 km/h) performance "on the deck" could be equaled by few aircraft of the time. The normally docile and pleasant handling characteristics of the P6M-1 were replaced by some severe compressibility effects above Mach 0.8. These included rapid changes in directional trim, severe buffeting, and wing drop requiring high control inputs to counter. Until those problems were fixed, the P6M-2 could not be considered for use by the fleet. The problems were identified as being caused by the larger engine nacelles required for the J75s. There were also problems on the water, including a tendency for the tip floats to dig in under certain situations, and engine surges. These problems were eventually solved, but time had run out just as the first crews were training for its operational debut. Eisenhower's administration was making major defense budget cuts that forced the Navy to make choices. In August 1959 Martin was told to halt operations and the program was about to be canceled. Seaplane operations were a small component of U.S. naval aviation, and the P6M was significantly over budget and behind schedule and competing with aircraft carriers for funding. The Navy had also developed a potentially superior system for the nuclear strike role, the ballistic missile submarine.

In the age of the ICBM and SLBM, the manned bomber had become an expensive and unreliable nuclear weapon delivery system. The P6M program had already cost $400 million (about $2.5 billion ) and could not be justified without the strategic mission.

All examples were scrapped although some tail sections were retained for testing, and one of these is now in the Glenn L. Martin Maryland Aviation Museum.

Martin tried unsuccessfully to market the technology in the civilian market, with a version called the SeaMistress but there were no takers, and the company soon abandoned the aircraft business entirely to focus on missiles and electronics. The P6M was the final aircraft constructed by the Glenn L. Martin Company.

Variants
XP6M-1 prototypes, two built (BuNos 138821, 138822). Both crashed.
YP6M-1 pre-production model, six built (BuNos 143822-143827). All six examples were scrapped when the program was cancelled.
P6M-2 production model, eight built (BuNos 145876-145899). 145877-145879 were completed and flown, 145876 and 145880-145883 were completed but not flown. Contracts for 145884-145899 were cancelled.

Specifications (P6M-2)

See also

References

Notes

Bibliography

External Links

Cancelled: The Navy’s SeaMaster, Smithsonian Air & Space Magazine, 2012

P6M
Martin PM6 SeaMaster
Flying boats
Jet seaplanes and flying boats
Quadjets
High-wing aircraft
Cancelled military aircraft projects of the United States
T-tail aircraft
Aircraft first flown in 1955